Cindy Burger (born 3 September 1980 in The Hague) is a former Dutch international footballer.

Burger made 57 appearances for the Netherlands women's national football team in her career. Her debut came on 16 December 1998 against Scotland and her last match was on 14 October 2004 against Germany.

International goals

Scores and results list the Netherlands goal tally first.

References

1980 births
Living people
Footballers from The Hague
Dutch women's footballers
Netherlands women's international footballers
Women's association football midfielders
Eredivisie (women) players
Willem II (women) players
VVV-Venlo (women) players